The 4th V Chart Awards (第四届音悦V榜年度盛典) is a music awards hosted by YinYueTai in 2016 at Cadillac Arena, Beijing. The emcee for the awards were David Wu, Li Ai and Tao Guo.

Shortlisted Criteria 
1. The "data-based category" award nominees are artists who released an official MV in between January 1, 2016 to December 31, 2016 and the artist must be ranked in the chart throughout the whole year.

2. "The Most Popular Artists" series of shortlisted nominees are the top 30 artists in the TOP100 list in all five regions.

3. "Artist Award" series nominees are artists who released music-related work(s) in between January 2016 to December 31, 2016. In addition to the results of the MV chart, the awards will be based on a combination of criteria: the standard of the released album, participation in offline activities, performances, film and television, hosting and the results that accompanies.

4. "Composition Category" award nominees are artists who released an official MV from January 1, 2016 to December 31, 2016 and the artist must have the most #1 wins in the chart throughout the whole year. "MV Awards" are based on MV production standards, word of mouth, shooting, conception, production and list of achievements to determine the winning entries.

5. "Album of The Year" is determined according to the annual album sales data ranking on the Yin Yue Shopping Mall 2016. Shortlisted nominees are the top 10 albums on the data ranking.

Voting 
On February 5, 2016, the award ceremony was officially launched. On February 29, the nominees for the "Favourite Artist of the Year" series was announced. Voting of the first phase of nominees commenced on March 7 and ended on March 19. On the March 8, a concept video was released. On March 21, the voting for the second phase of the "Favourite Artist of the Year" ended on April 5.

Cinematography 
The presentation of the ceremony used live webcast technology which divided into Live HD and a 360-degree panorama live accompanied with  three interfaces for the backstage live. Live broadcast has a choice of standard definition and HD to choose from. The 360-degree panoramic live technology facilitates live performances from different angles. Backstage live showcases interviews with various artists who are present.

Personnel

Host 

YinYueTai

Official Broadcasting Site 

StarTV YinYueTai

Data provider 

YinYueTai Mobile App, YinYueTai PC App, YinYueTai Official Website, Baidu

Interworking Partners 

Billboard, Gaon Charts

Collaboration Partners 

Hunan Broadcasting System, Dragon TV, Sohu TV, KpopStars, Baidu, Miaopai by MeituPic and more.

Winners and nominees

Wardrobe Malfunctions 
G.E.M. suffered a wardrobe malfunction which caused her to fell on stage. Luhan was seen with a running nose which he later explained himself to be having rhinitis during the backstage interview.

External links 
Homepage

References 

2016 in Chinese music
2016 music awards
Events in Beijing
V Chart Awards
April 2016 events in China